John William Crofoot (March 24, 1927–August 23, 1988) was an American politician who served as a Republican member of the Kansas State Senate from 1971 to 1980. In addition to his time in the State Senate, Crofoot was a farmer and rancher, and founded an advertising company.

References

Republican Party Kansas state senators
20th-century American politicians
People from Chase County, Kansas
1927 births
1988 deaths